is a Japanese sabre fencer. He won a bronze medal, as a member of the Japanese fencing team, at the 2010 Asian Games in Guangzhou, China.

Ogawa represented Japan at the 2008 Summer Olympics in Beijing, where he competed in the men's individual sabre event. He lost the first preliminary round match to Senegal's Mamadou Keita, with a sudden death score of 14–15.

References

External links
Profile – FIE
NBC 2008 Olympics profile

Japanese male sabre fencers
Living people
Olympic fencers of Japan
Fencers at the 2008 Summer Olympics
Asian Games medalists in fencing
Sportspeople from Tokyo
1983 births
Fencers at the 2010 Asian Games
Asian Games bronze medalists for Japan
Medalists at the 2010 Asian Games
20th-century Japanese people
21st-century Japanese people